The European and African Zone is one of the three zones of regional Davis Cup competition in 2009.

In the European and African Zone there are four different groups in which teams compete against each other to advance to the next group.

Format

The fourteen teams will be divided into two sections, Section A and Section B. There will be a Round Robin with eight teams in each section. The eight nations will be divided into two pools of four. The top two teams in each pool will advance to the Final Pool of four teams from which the two highest-placed nations are promoted to Europe and Africa Group II in 2010. The bottom two teams or the bottom team of each pool of the two Round Robins will compete against each other in the Relegation Pool. The lowest-placed nations are relegated to Europe and Africa Group IV in 2010.

Information

Section A:

Venue: Istanbul, Turkey

Surface: Hard – outdoors

Dates: 23 April – 3 May

Section B:

Venue: Tunis, Tunisia

Surface: Clay – outdoors

Dates: 1–5 April

Participating teams

Section A

 
 
 
 
 
 
 
 

Section B

Section A

Group A

Matches

Iceland vs. Luxembourg

Botswana vs. Estonia

Botswana vs. Luxembourg

Iceland vs. Estonia

Estonia vs. Luxembourg

Botswana vs. Iceland

Group B

Matches

Turkey vs. Greece

Rwanda vs. Madagascar

Turkey vs. Rwanda

Madagascar vs. Greece

Rwanda vs. Greece

Turkey vs. Madagascar

Promotion Pool

 The matches Turkey-Greece and Luxembourg-Estonia will not be played as they already played against each other in the previous round. Furthermore, the points gained at the matches played in the previous round will count for the table.

Matches

Turkey vs. Estonia

Luxembourg vs. Greece

Turkey vs. Luxembourg

Greece vs. Estonia

Relegation Pool

 The matches Botswana-Iceland and Madagascar-Rwanda will not be played as they already played against each other in the previous round. Furthermore, the points gained at the matches played in the previous round will count for the table.

Matches

Iceland vs. Madagascar

Botswana vs. Rwanda

Botswana vs. Madagascar

Rwanda vs. Iceland

Section B

Group A

Matches

San Marino vs. Morocco

Tunisia vs. Nigeria

Nigeria vs. Morocco

Tunisia vs. San Marino

Tunisia vs. Morocco

San Marino vs. Nigeria

Group B

Matches

Andorra vs. Norway

Namibia vs. Bosnia and Herzegovina

Namibia vs. Norway

Andorra vs. Bosnia and Herzegovina

Andorra vs. Namibia

Bosnia and Herzegovina vs. Norway

Promotion play-off Group (1st to 4th)

 The matches Norway-Bosnia and Herzegovina and Morocco-Tunisia will not be played as they already played against each other in the previous round. Furthermore, the points gained at the matches played in the previous round will count for the table.

Matches

Bosnia and Herzegovina vs. Morocco

Tunisia vs. Norway

Norway vs. Morocco

Tunisia vs. Bosnia and Herzegovina

Relegation play-off Group(5th to 8th)

 The matches Andorra-Namibia and Nigeria-San Marino will not be played as they already played against each other in the previous round. Furthermore, the points gained at the matches played in the previous round will count for the table.

Matches

Andorra vs. Nigeria

Namibia vs. San Marino

Namibia vs. Nigeria

San Marino vs. Andorra

External links
Davis Cup draw details

Group III
Davis Cup Europe/Africa Zone